The 2022 Navy Midshipmen football team represented the United States Naval Academy in the 2022 NCAA Division I FBS football season. The Midshipmen play their home games at Navy–Marine Corps Memorial Stadium in Annapolis, Maryland, and compete in the American Athletic Conference (The American). They are led by fifteen-year head coach Ken Niumatalolo.

Schedule
Navy and The American announced the 2022 football schedule on February 17, 2022.

Game summaries

No. 19 (FCS) Delaware

Memphis

at East Carolina

at Air Force

Tulsa

at SMU

Houston

Temple

at Cincinnati

vs. No. 20 Notre Dame

at No. 20 UCF

vs. Army

References

Navy
Navy Midshipmen football seasons
Navy Midshipmen football